Giovanni dalle Carceri (died 1358) was a Lord of Euboea.

He was the son of Peter dalle Carceri and his second wife. He married Florence Sanudo, who became the seventh Duchess of the Archipelago in 1362, daughter and successor of John I, Duke of the Archipelago. Their son was Nicholas III dalle Carceri, who inherited both the Duchy and the Lordship.

Sources
Miller, William. The Latins in the Levant: A History of Frankish Greece (1204–1566). London: 1908.

References

 Ancestry of Sultana Nur-Banu (Cecilia Venier-Baffo)

1358 deaths
People from the Duchy of the Archipelago
Triarchs of Negroponte
Year of birth unknown
14th-century Italian nobility
Giovanni
Medieval Euboeans